Freeburn is a census-designated place, unincorporated community and coal town in Pike County, Kentucky, United States.

A post office called Liss was established in the community in 1911. In 1932, it was renamed Freeburn supposedly for a freeburning coal seam fire.

Climate
The climate in this area is characterized by hot, humid summers and generally mild to cool winters.  According to the Köppen Climate Classification system, Freeburn has a humid subtropical climate, abbreviated "Cfa" on climate maps.

Demographics

References

Census-designated places in Pike County, Kentucky
Unincorporated communities in Kentucky
Census-designated places in Kentucky
Coal towns in Kentucky